The Tawapuku River is a river of the Northland Region of New Zealand's North Island. It flows generally southwest to join the Awarua River 40 kilometres north of Dargaville.

See also
List of rivers of New Zealand

References
 

Rivers of the Northland Region
Rivers of New Zealand
Kaipara Harbour catchment